Marie-Christine Adam (born 24 September 1950) is a French actress.

Filmography

Theatre

External links

References

1950 births
Living people
French film actresses
French television actresses
Place of birth missing (living people)
20th-century French actresses
21st-century French actresses
French stage actresses